The Senate of Saint Lucia is the upper house of the Parliament of Saint Lucia. It has 11 appointed members. All members are appointed by the Governor-General, of which 6 are appointed on the Prime Minister's advice, 3 on the advice of the leader of the opposition, and 2 independent members which the Governor-General appoints using his or her own judgment.

History
The Senate was established when Saint Lucia became independent in 1979.

Membership
The Government Senators are:
 Pauline Antoine-Prospere
 Guibion Ferdinand
 Allison Jean
 Lisa Cassandra Jawahir
 Kaygianna Toussaint-Charley

The Opposition Senators are:
 Dominic Fedee
 Herod Stanislaus
 Angelina Phera Polius

Independent Senators are:
 Noorani Azeez
 Deale A. L. Lee

The president is Alvina Reynolds, appointed 24 November 2022.

See also
List of presidents of the Senate of Saint Lucia

References

Politics of Saint Lucia
Political organisations based in Saint Lucia
Government of Saint Lucia
Saint Lucia
1979 establishments in Saint Lucia